Urushibara (written: 漆原) is a Japanese surname. Notable people with the surname include:

, given name Yoshijirō, Japanese printmaker
, Japanese politician
, Japanese manga artist

See also
Urushibara nickel, a nickel-based hydrogenation catalyst named in honor of chemist Yoshiyuki Urushibara

Japanese-language surnames